Thomas Aaron Shearn (born August 28, 1977) is a former Major League Baseball pitcher. Shearn, who spent 11 years in the minor leagues, made his big league debut for the Cincinnati Reds on August 26, in a game in which he started for the Reds against the Florida Marlins. Before being called up, Shearn was living out of the groundskeeper's trailer at the stadium of the Reds' Louisville affiliate. Shearn had driven in his trailer from Louisville, Kentucky, to get to the game, as he was supposed to start that day for the Reds' AAA affiliate, the Louisville Bats. He made two more starts for the Reds in September, the best one coming in a 7-0 win over the Mets on September 5, 2007. In that game he threw six scoreless innings, striking out three and surrendering three hits. Shearn is famously quoted as saying, "Tom Shearn is only one man".

On May 30, 2008, the Reds sold his contract to the Samsung Lions of the KBO League. Shearn was signed by the Minnesota Twins to a minor league contract on July 28 and he played for the Rochester Red Wings, the Twins' Triple-A affiliate, for the rest of the year.

References

External links

Korea Baseball Organization
Venezuelan Professional Baseball League
DeadSpin (Story)

1977 births
Living people
American expatriate baseball players in South Korea
Auburn Doubledays players
Baseball players from Columbus, Ohio
Chattanooga Lookouts players
Cincinnati Reds players
Gulf Coast Astros players
KBO League pitchers
Leones del Caracas players
American expatriate baseball players in Venezuela
Louisville Bats players
Major League Baseball pitchers
Mayos de Navojoa players
American expatriate baseball players in Mexico
New Orleans Zephyrs players
Quad Cities River Bandits players
Rochester Red Wings players
Round Rock Express players
Samsung Lions players